Acacia mathuataensis is a species of legume in the family Fabaceae.
It is found only in Fiji.

References

Sources

mathuataensis
Endemic flora of Fiji
Critically endangered plants
Taxonomy articles created by Polbot